Södra Dryckesgränd (Swedish: "Southern Drunkenness Alley") is an alley in Gamla stan, the old town of Stockholm, Sweden.  Connecting Skeppsbron to Järntorgsgatan, it forms a parallel street to Norra Dryckesgränd and Slussplan.

The alley appears in historical records as cartusegrenden (1518), södre Cartuse grennen (1527), chartuser gränden (1625), Södra Drycks gr[änd] (1733), and Dryks-Gränden (1740).  The reason for the present name of the alley is unknown. See Norra Dryckesgränd for further details.

See also 
List of streets and squares in Gamla stan

References

External links 
hitta.se - Location map and virtual walk

Streets in Stockholm